Cleopatra ferruginea is a species of freshwater snails with an operculum, aquatic gastropod molluscs in the family Paludomidae.

Distribution
The holotype was found in Zanzibar.

This species is also found in Burundi, Egypt, Ethiopia, Kenya, Sudan, Tanzania, Uganda and South Africa.

Its natural habitats are intermittent rivers, swamps, and freshwater marshes.

References

 Brown, D. S. (1980). Freshwater snails of Africa and their medical importance. Taylor & Francis, London. 1-487
 Connolly, M. (1925). The non-marine Mollusca of Portuguese East Africa. Transactions of the Royal Society of South Africa, 12 (3): 105-220, pl. 4-8. Cape Town. 
 Germain, L. (1935). Contribution à l'étude de la faune du Mozambique. Voyage de M.P. Lesne (1928–29). 17e note – mollusques terrestres et fluviatiles. Memórias e Estudos do Museu Zoológico da Universidadae de Coimbra [Series1] 80: 1–72.
 Appleton, C.C. (1977). The fresh-water Mollusca of Tongaland with a note on molluscan distribution in Lake Sibaya. Annals of the Natal Museum 23(1):129-144.
 Connolly, M. (1939). A monographic survey of South African non-marine Mollusca. Annals of the South African Museum 33: 1–660
 Brown D.S. (1994). Freshwater snails of Africa and their medical importance, 2nd edition. London: Taylor and Francis, 607 p

External links 
 Lea, I.; Lea, H. C. (1851). Description of a new genus of the family Melaniana, and of many new species of the genus Melania, chiefly collected by Hugh Cuming, Esq., during his zoological voyage in the East , and now first described. Proceedings of the Zoological Society of London. 18: 179-197
 Pilsbry, H. A.; Bequaert, J. C. (1927). The aquatic mollusks of the Belgian Congo: with a geographical and ecological account of Congo malacology. Bulletin of the American Museum of Natural History. 53: 69-602
 Bourguignat, J.-R. (1879). Description de diverses espèces terrestres et fluviatiles et de différents genres de Mollusques de l'Égypte, de l'Abyssinie, de Zanzibar, du Sénégal et du Centre de l'Afrique. 54 pp. Paris: Jules Tremblay
 Martens, E. von. (1879). Recente Conchylien von Bagamojo. Sitzungsberichte der Gesellschaft Naturforschender Freunde zu Berlin. 1879: 102-103
 Petit de la Saussaye, S. (1851). Description de coquilles nouvelles. Journal de Conchyliologie. 2: 259-269; pl. 7 fig. 1-4, 7-8; pl. 8 fig. 3, 5-9

Paludomidae
Gastropods described in 1850
Taxonomy articles created by Polbot